The Regular Batasang Pambansa (English: Regular National Assembly), or the First Batasang Pambansa, was the meeting of the Batasang Pambansa from the beginning of its session on July 23, 1984 until it was abolished by President Corazon Aquino on March 25, 1986.

Events

Marcos impeachment attempt
On August 13, 1985, 56 assemblymen signed a resolution calling for the impeachment of President Marcos for graft and corruption, culpable violation of the Constitution, gross violation of his oath of office and other high crimes.

They cited the San Jose Mercury News exposé of the Marcoses' multimillion-dollar investment and property holdings in the United States. The properties allegedly amassed by the First Family were the Crown Building, Lindenmere Estate, and a number of residential apartments (in New Jersey and New York), a shopping center in New York, mansions (in London, Rome and Honolulu), the Helen Knudsen Estate in Hawaii and three condominiums in San Francisco, California.

The Assemblymen also included in the complaint the misuse and misapplication of funds "for the construction of the Film Center, where X-rated and pornographic films are exhibited, contrary to public morals and Filipino customs and traditions".

The following day, the Committee on Justice, Human Rights and Good Government dismissed the impeachment complaint for being insufficient in form and substance:

The resolution is no more than a hodge-podge of unsupported conclusions, distortion of law, exacerbated by ultra partisan considerations. It does not allege ultimate facts constituting an impeachable offense under the Constitution.

In sum, the Committee finds that the complaint is not sufficient in form and substance to warrant its further consideration. It is not sufficient in form because the verification made by the affiants that the allegations in the resolution "are true and correct of our own knowledge" is transparently false. It taxes the ken of men to believe that the affiants individually could swear to the truth of allegations, relative to the transactions that allegedly transpired in foreign countries given the barrier of geography and the restrictions of their laws. More important, the resolution cannot be sufficient in substance because its careful assay shows that it is a mere charade of conclusions.

The People Power Revolution

The People Power Revolution from February 22–25, 1986 was a series of mostly nonviolent mass demonstrations in the Metro Manila area. The peaceful protests were held after a call by Archbishop of Manila Jaime Cardinal Sin for civilian support of rebels, and this led to the fall of Marcos' regime and the installation of Corazon Aquino as president.

Abolition
On March 25, 1986, President Aquino signed Presidential Proclamation No. 3, known as the "Freedom Constitution". Article I, Section 3 of this provisional constitution abolished the Regular Batasang Pambansa inter alia:

Section 3. ARTICLE VIII (The Batasang Pambansa), ARTICLE IX (The Prime Minister and the Cabinet), ARTICLE XVI (Amendments), ARTICLE XVII (Transitory Provisions) and all amendments thereto are deemed superseded by this Proclamation.

Sessions
First Regular Session: July 23, 1984 – June 7, 1985
Second Regular Session: July 22, 1985 – March 25, 1986

Leadership
Prime Minister
Cesar E. A. Virata  (KBL, Parliamentary District of Cavite)
Salvador H. Laurel (UNIDO) appointed on February 25, 1986, concurrently Vice-President
Deputy Prime Minister
Jose A. Roño, Jr.  (KBL, Parliamentary District of Samar)
Speaker of the Batasan
Nicanor E. Yñiguez, Jr.  (KBL, Parliamentary District of Southern Leyte)
Speaker Pro-Tempore
Salipada K. Pendatun (KBL, Parliamentary District of Maguindanao)
Macacuna B. Dimaporo (KBL, Parliamentary District of Lanao del Sur), elected 1985
Majority Floor Leader
Jose A. Roño  (KBL, Parliamentary District of Samar)
Minority Floor Leader
Jose B. Laurel, Jr.  (UNIDO, Parliamentary District of Batangas)

Legislation
The Regular Batasang Pambansa passed a total of 181 laws: Mga Batas Pambansa Blg. 703 to 884.

Major legislation
Batas Pambansa Blg. 877 – Stabilization  and Regulation of, Rentals of Certain Residential Units for Other Purposes
Batas Pambansa Blg. 880 – Public Assembly Act of 1985
Batas Pambansa Blg. 881 – Omnibus Election Code of the Philippines 
Batas Pambansa Blg. 882 – Order of Succession Act
Batas Pambansa Blg. 883 – Special Presidential and Vice-Presidential Elections Act
Batas Pambansa Blg. 884 – Presidential Electoral Tribunal Act

Members

Member of Parliament

 The Supreme Court proclaimed Pacificador's opponent, Evelio Javier, the real winner in 1986.
 Romualdez preferred to sit as Ambassador of the Philippines to the United States, thereby he was disqualified to sit as Mambabatas Pambansa of Leyte.
 Pendatun died in office on January 27, 1985 .
 Climaco was assassinated on November 14, 1984.

See also
Congress of the Philippines
1984 Philippine parliamentary election

References

External links
Congress

Defunct unicameral legislatures
Batasang Pambansa